Mixed coniferous forest is a vegetation type dominated by a mixture of broadleaf trees and conifers. It is generally located in mountains, below the upper montane vegetation type.

Sierra Nevada range
Characteristic conifers include Ponderosa Pine (Pinus ponderosa), Sugar Pine (Pinus lambertiana), Incense Cedar (Calocedrus decurrens), White Fir (Abies concolor), Douglas Fir (Pseudotsuga menziesii), and Giant Sequoias (Sequoiadendron giganteum) in pockets. Characteristic broadleaved trees include Black Oak (Quercus kelloggii), and understory trees and shrubs, including Canyon Live Oak (Quercus chrysolepis), Dogwood (Cornus spp.), Mountain Misery (Chamaebatia foliolosa), and Manzanitas (Arctostaphylos spp.).

See also
Temperate broadleaf and mixed forest

See also
 USFS Joint Fire Science Program: Defining Mixed Conifer forest — in the Southwestern plateaus and uplands; the Central and Southern Rocky Mountains; the Sierra Nevada; and the Transverse and Peninsular Ranges in Southern California.
 USDA Forest Service: Mixed Conifer Forest
 NPS.gov: Mixed Conifer Forest in Bandelier National Monument — New Mexico.
 Colorado State Forest Service: Mixed Conifer Forest
 Minnesota Department of Natural Resources: Mixed coniferous-deciduous forest 
  U.S. Forest Service: Cascade Mixed Forest--Coniferous Forest--Alpine Meadow Province — Pacific Northwest.
 The Forest Foundation: Restoring mixed-conifer forests
 Las Pilitas Native Plant Nursery Database: Info on California mixed evergreen forest
 Plant Communities of Mount Diablo - Mixed Evergreen Forest

References

Forests
Montane forests

Terrestrial biomes